O-Town (also known as OTWN or OTOWN) is an American boy band formed from the first season of the reality television series Making the Band in 2000. As of 2015, the group consists of Erik-Michael Estrada, Trevor Penick, Jacob Underwood, and Dan Miller. The original line up included Ashley Parker Angel and Ikaika Kahoano, who was replaced by Miller after dropping out of the group.

After releasing two albums near the end of the boy band fad of the late 1990s and early 2000s, the group disbanded in 2003.  The group was originally managed by Lou Pearlman during their first season of Making the Band, but later managed by Mike Cronin and Mike Morin for their debut album and remaining television seasons.

History

Formation and debut album (1999–2001)
O-Town was assembled for the first season of the ABC reality television series Making the Band; the group was named after Orlando, Florida, the city where auditions were held. In the selection process, Lou Pearlman and a panel of judges selected Ashley Parker Angel, Erik Michael Estrada, Trevor Penick, Jacob Underwood, and Ikaika Kahoano. However, Kahoano left for personal reasons and was replaced by Dan Miller.

After season one, former Arista Records executive Clive Davis signed O-Town to his new label J Records.  Their first release, the self-titled O-Town, boosted by the publicity of the weekly television series, debuted at no. 5 on the Billboard 200 album chart and sold more than three million copies worldwide. Their first single, "Liquid Dreams", peaked at number 10 on the Billboard Hot 100.

In the late spring of 2001, O-Town released "All or Nothing", and the song became their biggest hit of their career as a group. "All or Nothing", reaching no. 3 on the Hot 100. In 2001, the group was the opening act for Britney Spears' Dream Within a Dream Tour in the U.S.

O2 and split (2002–2003)
O-Town's second album O2 was released in November 2002 by J Records. It included a newer single, "We Fit Together". The album was observed to have a different sound from O-Town's debut album, with a mix of "soulful ballads and songs with more of a rock ‘n’ roll approach," according to Contemporary Musicians. MTV News reported that O-Town hoped that the album would show the group to be more than "'NSYNC wannabes." However, with teen pop trending down in listener interest in 2002, O2 did not sell as well as the first O-Town album. As a result, in 2003, J Records released O-Town from their contract, and the group disbanded.

Solo careers (2003–2013)
The members of O-Town moved on to solo careers. The most successful member was Ashley Parker Angel, who was signed to Universal's Blackground Records, and also given his own reality show on MTV, There and Back. Angel released a solo album, Soundtrack to Your Life, in 2006. In 2007, he began playing the role of Link Larkin in the Broadway production of Hairspray. Trevor Penick signed to Mach 1 Music and performed as Tre Scott. Erik Michael Estrada stayed in the music business as a songwriter. Jacob Underwood went on to start his own country band, Jacob's Loc.

In 2013, Angel declined to join an O-Town reunion: "It was a difficult decision, but ultimately necessary to move on with the next chapter of my career."

Lines & Circles and single Empty Space (2013–present)

On May 28, 2014, O-Town released a preview of the single "Skydive" on SoundCloud. The single is from their third studio album Lines & Circles. The album was released on August 24, 2014.

In 2017, they premiered a new single "Empty Space" in addition to announcing a new EP. They also announced a new 2017 tour featuring Ryan Cabrera on select dates, as well as some spots on the I Love the 90s nationwide tour.

Their Part 1 EP was released on August 4, 2017.

In June 2019, O-Town planned on filing a trademark for their band name, which Universal Music Group believed was too similar to the Motown Records label.

On August 2, 2019, they released The O.T.W.N. Album.

Members
Current 
 Erik-Michael Estrada (2000–2003, 2013–present)
 Dan Miller (2000–2003, 2013–present)
 Jacob Underwood (2000–2003, 2013–present)
 Trevor Penick (2000–2003, 2013–present)
Former 
 Ashley Parker Angel (2000–2003) 
 Ikaika Kahoano (2000)

Discography

Studio albums 
 O-Town (2001)
 O2 (2002)
 Lines & Circles (2014)
 The O.T.W.N. Album (2019)

Awards and nominations

Tours

Opening act
 Britney Spears – Dream Within a Dream Tour (2001)
 Pop2000Tour hosted by Lance Bass.  (active)
Viral campaign surfaced which suggested O-Town as the headliner for the Upstate NY annual festival at the Afton Fairgrounds. Rumor turned out to be false, disappointing many local fans (2000).

References

External links
 O-Town Official Website

American boy bands
Lou Pearlman
Musical groups disestablished in 2003
Musical groups established in 2000
Musical groups from Orlando, Florida
Musical groups reestablished in 2013
Teen pop groups
Participants in American reality television series
Sony BMG artists
Vocal quintets